Francis Underhill (16 May 187824 January 1943) was an Anglican bishop in the first half of the 20th century.

Underhill was educated at Shrewsbury School and Exeter College, Oxford. He was ordained in 1901 and was a curate at St Paul's Swindon and St Thomas the Martyr, Oxford and then Vicar of St Alban the Martyr, Birmingham until 1925. He was the first secretary of the Federation of Catholic Priests and from 1925 until 1932 he was Warden of Liddon House, and priest in charge of the Grosvenor Chapel, Mayfair when he was appointed Dean of Rochester, a position he held until his confirmation as Bishop of Bath and Wells in 1937. Shortly after confirmation, he was consecrated a bishop on St Andrew's Day 1937 (30 November), by Cosmo Lang, Archbishop of Canterbury, at St Paul's Cathedral. An author, he was a cousin of Evelyn Underhill.

References

External links
Bibliographic directory from Project Canterbury

1878 births
People educated at Shrewsbury School
Alumni of Exeter College, Oxford
Deans of Rochester
20th-century Church of England bishops
Bishops of Bath and Wells
1943 deaths